Mehdi Samii (1918–2010) was an Iranian chartered accountant, banker and economist. Samii is credited as "one of the chief architects of Iran's rapid economic and Industrial growth in the 1960s", as well as "a midwife of in the creation of the [Central] bank [of Iran]" and "more than anyone else responsible" for it. According to Abbas Milani, "the fact that the bank was a relatively independent institution, free from corruption and political interference and unusually efficient", is attributed to his leadership.

Biography
Samii was born in Tehran in 1910. He held office as the Governor of the Central Bank of Iran (1964–1969; 1970–1971), the head of Plan and Budget Organization of Iran (1969–1971) and Ambassador-at-large (1971–1973). Before that, Samii rejected job offers for ministerial roles twice: Once in 1960 when Jafar Sharif-Emami offered him the role of the minister of agriculture and the next in the following year when Ali Amini proposed that he become minister of commerce.

He was a co-founder of Iranian Institute of Certified Accountants. He died in 2010.

References

External links

20th-century Iranian economists
Governors of the Central Bank of Iran
People's Party (Iran) politicians
Iranian bankers
Iranian accountants
Rastakhiz Party politicians
1918 births
2010 deaths